Southwest Middlesex is a municipality in Middlesex County, Ontario, Canada.

The restructured municipality of Southwest Middlesex was incorporated on January 1, 2001. This amalgamation joined the Village of Glencoe and the Village of Wardsville with the Townships of Ekfrid and Mosa. Southwest Middlesex had a population of 5,723 in the Canada 2016 Census. Southwest Middlesex is located in the southwest corner of Middlesex County, about halfway between London and Chatham.

Communities

The township includes the communities of Appin, Ekfrid, Glencoe, Lewis Corners, Macksville, Mayfair, Newbury Station, North Appin Station, North Ekfrid, North Glencoe Station, Riverside, Strathburn, Tait’s Corners, Wardsville and Woodgreen. It surrounds, but does not include, the independent village of Newbury.  The township administrative offices are located in Glencoe.

Wardsville was the site of the Battle of Longwoods during the War of 1812.

Transportation
Canadian National Railway's Longwood Subdivision passes through Southwest Middlesex. A signpost for Appin is at mile 23 of the Longwood Sub.

Demographics 

See also
List of townships in Ontario

References

 Stott, Greg. Been to North Ekfrid Lately?": the Story of a Crossroads Community in Ontario, Arkona, Ontario: G. Stott Publishing, 2002

External links

Lower-tier municipalities in Ontario
Municipalities in Middlesex County, Ontario